Stanton University is a non-profit college founded in 1996. It has two campuses, the main campus in Garden Grove, California, and the secondary campus in Los Angeles, California.

It received WASC Accreditation in 2021.

References

External links
 

Universities and colleges in California
1996 establishments in California
Educational institutions established in 1996
Education in Garden Grove, California